James Sproule Myles  (1877 – 13 February 1956) was an Irish soldier, politician and rugby union player.

Rugby player
Myles played rugby for City of Derry and Ireland. In October 1899, together with Arnold Harvey, he was a member of the Ireland team that went on a tour of Canada. This was their first ever overseas tour. While playing, he broke his leg and he had to remain in Canada until December while the rest of the touring party returned home in November.

Soldier
During World War I, Myles served in the British Army with both the Royal Inniskilling Fusiliers and the Royal Engineers. He won the Military Cross for bravery and reached the rank of Major.

Personal life
He was among a group of 40 Unionists kidnapped in February 1922. "Though apparently not an Orangeman, Myles was a Prince Mason in a chapter well stocked with Orange luminaries."

Politician
Myles served as an independent Teachta Dála (TD) in Dáil Éireann for twenty years. He was elected on his first attempt at the 1923 general election and was subsequently re-elected six times, winning the greatest number of first preferences in each of the seven elections. He initially represented Donegal but then switched to Donegal East when the 8-seat constituency was divided in 1937.

He lost his seat at the 1943 general election, and was defeated again at the 1944 general election.

He died in 1956 and is buried at St. Anne's Church in Ballyshannon, County Donegal.

References

1877 births
1956 deaths
British Army personnel of World War I
City of Derry R.F.C. players
Independent TDs
Irish people of World War I
Irish rugby union players
Members of the 4th Dáil
Members of the 5th Dáil
Members of the 6th Dáil
Members of the 7th Dáil
Members of the 8th Dáil
Members of the 9th Dáil
Members of the 10th Dáil
Politicians from County Donegal
Recipients of the Military Cross
Royal Engineers officers
Royal Inniskilling Fusiliers officers
Rugby union players from County Donegal
Sportspeople from Derry (city)